Eugène Foveau (26 November 1886 – 5 January 1957) was a French trumpeter and cornetist. He was professor of trumpet at the Conservatoire de Paris from 1925 to 1947.

Life 
Born in Dijon, Foveau is a former student of Merri Franquin at the Conservatoire de Paris. In 1907, he won a First Prize for trumpet. In 1925, he succeeded Alexandre Petit in his cornet class. In 1945 he took over the direction of a trumpet class. Marcel Caens, Robert Pichaureau,  Pierre Pollin, Pierre Thibaud, Raymond Sabarich and Roger Delmotte were some among his many students.

Foveau died in Paris at age 70.

References

External links 
  Biography
 Eugène Foveau

1886 births
1957 deaths
Musicians from Dijon
Conservatoire de Paris alumni
Academic staff of the Conservatoire de Paris
French classical trumpeters
Male trumpeters
20th-century French musicians
20th-century trumpeters
20th-century French male musicians
20th-century classical musicians